Osondu is a Nigerian surname. Notable people with the name include:

Philip Osondu (born 1971), Nigerian footballer
E. C. Osondu, Nigerian writer
Chidi Osondu, Nigerian-American record producer and songwriter
Christopher Osondu, Nigerian Navy officer